William Henry, Prince of Nassau-Saarbrücken (6 March 1718 – 24 July 1768), was Prince of Nassau-Saarbrücken from 1741 until his death.

Life 
William Henry was born in Usingen, the fifth son of William Henry of Nassau-Usingen Born and Princess Charlotte Amalia of Nassau-Dillenburg.  His father died just weeks before his birth.  His mother then acted as guardian and regent until her death in 1738.  She provided a comprehensive education and raised her sons in the Calvinist faith.  In 1730 and 1731, he and his brother were enrolled at the University of Strasbourg and was taught by various tutors.  He probably also studied for a while at the University of Geneva, which was popular among reformed students.  His Grand Tour took William Henry to the court of Louis XV in France, among other places.

After his mother's death, his brother Charles acted as regent until William Henry came of age in 1741.  In 1741, the brothers decided to divide their inheritance.  Charles received Nassau-Usingen on the right bank of the Rhine; William Henry received Nassau-Saarbrücken on the left bank.  At the time, Nassau-Saarbrücken measured about 12 square miles and it had .  This made it one of the smallest principalities in the Holy Roman Empire.

Politics and economy 
Shortly after his accession to power, he participated with his Royal-Allemand regiment in the War of the Austrian Succession.  In 1742 he sold his regiment to the Landgrave of Hesse-Darmstadt, during his stay in Frankfurt on the occasion of the coronation of Charles VII.  During this visit, he also met Princess Sophie of Erbach, his future wife.

He later took part in the Seven Years' War, again with his own troops.  He had a close relationship with France, his large neighbour.  He often traveled to Paris, where he received military honors—as was usual at the time for ruling nobility—including a promotion to field marshal.

William Henry reformed the administration and justice.  He separated these two branches of government and issued some orders typical of the enlightened absolutists of his time.  These included a cameralistic economic policy.  He took measures to standardize taxes and introduced a modern cadastre on the Austrian model.  He also promoted modern agricultural methods, such as the potato cultivation and pest control.  He was also involved in coal mining and iron smelting.  He nationalized the mines and leased the ironworks to entrepreneurs such as Cerf Beer.  He laid the basis for a proto-industrialized economy, which would later evolve into the highly industrialized Saarland region.  Despite the increase in revenues, his financial situation did not improve, because of his high spending on construction activities. He died in Saarbrücken.

Extension of the residence 

When William Henry's reign began, he and his family and some noble families moved from Usingen to Saarbrücken and he began to develop his capital.  The city had been severely affected by the confusion of the Thirty Years' War and the War of the Reunions.  It was redesigned and expanded into a baroque capital, especially by the architect Friedrich Joachim Stengel.  Noteworthy buildings from this periods are the Saarbrücken Castle, the Louis Church and Basilica of St. John.  He also built a number of palaces and town houses.  The downside of his magnificent city was an immense debt, which his son and successor Louis had to deal with.  Nevertheless, the city of Saarbrücken is still dominated by William Henry's buildings and they keep his memory alive.

William Henry as enlightened absolutist 
William Henry and his princely contemporaries show the possibilities and limits of an enlightened absolutist policy.  As much as he insisted on enlightened principles of legal reforms, continued economic stimulus and the exercise of religious tolerance, he also remained a patriarchal ruler who forbade his subjects to actively participate in government and who tried to regulate all areas of life with an immense flood of regulations, and who suppressed social protests harshly.

Marriage and issue 

William Henry married on 28 February 1742 in Erbach with Sophie (1725–1795), the daughter of Count George William of Erbach and granddaughter of George Albert II, Count of Erbach-Fürstenau.  With her, he had the following children:
 Sophie Auguste (1743–1745)
 Louis (1745–1794), Prince of Nassau-Saarbrücken
 Frederick Augustus (1748–1750)
 Anna Caroline (1751–1824), married:
 in 1769 with Duke Frederick Henry of Schleswig-Holstein-Sonderburg-Glücksburg
 in 1782 with Duke Frederick Charles Ferdinand of Brunswick-Bevern
 Wilhelmine Henriette (1752–1829)
 married in 1783 Louis Armand de Seiglières, Marquis de Soyecourt-Feuquières

Ancestors

References 
 Winfried Dotzauer: Fürst Wilhelm Heinrich von Nassau Saarbrücken, in: Richard van Dülmen and Reinhard Klimmt (eds.): Saarländische Geschichte. Eine Anthologie, St. Ingbert, 1995, S. 87-94
 Michael Jung: Zwischen Ackerbau und Fürstenhof. Saarbrücker und St. Johanner Bürgertum im 18. Jahrhundert, St. Ingbert, 1994
 Klaus Ries: Obrigkeit und Untertanen. Stadt- und Landproteste in Nassau-Saarbrücken im Zeitalter des Reformabsolutismus, Saarbrücken, 1997
 Müller-Blattau, Wendelin: Zarte Liebe fesselt mich. Das Liederbuch der Fürstin Sophie Erdmuthe von Nassau-Saarbrücken = Veröffentlichungen des Instituts für Landeskunde im Saarland, vol. 39, partial edition with adaptations by Ludwig Harig, separate facsimile mini-volume, Saarbrücken, 2001, p. 111

External links 
 About the funeral of William Henry of Nassau-Saarbrücken
 William Henry of Nassau-Saarbrücken in the Saarland biographies
 Christiane Rossner: William Henry  of Nassau-Saarbrücken brought baroque splendor and prosperity, online version of :de:Monumente magazine, issue 1.2011

Footnotes 

Princes of Nassau
People from Saarland
House of Nassau
1718 births
1768 deaths
18th-century German people
Recipients of the Order of the White Eagle (Poland)